Friesack (also Friesack/Mark) is a town in the Havelland district, in Brandenburg, Germany. It is known for its Mesolithic archaeological site.

Film shot in Friesack
 1923 : Die Schlucht des Todes (The Ravine of Death) directed by Luciano Albertini and Albert-Francis Bertoni

Demography

Sons and daughters of the town

 Emil Schallopp (1843-1919), chess master and writer
 Karsten Wettberg (born 1941), football coach
 Adalbert von Bredow (1814-1890), Prussian general

References

Localities in Havelland